Kenneth Desmond Colbung AM MBE (2 September 1931 – 12 January 2010), also known by his indigenous name Nundjan Djiridjarkan, was an Aboriginal Australian leader from the Noongar people who became prominent in the 1960s. He was appointed an MBE and an AM for his service to the Aboriginal community.

Life 
Colbung was born on the Moore River Aboriginal Settlement. His mother died when he was six, and he was then taken to live at Sister Kate's Home for Children. He worked for a time as a stockman. He joined the Australian Army in 1950, and served in Japan and in the Korean War. 

He was made a Justice of the Peace in 1980. Amongst his positions, Colbung was also deputy chairperson (1978-1984) and then chair (1984-1990) of the Australian Institute of Aboriginal and Torres Strait Islander Studies. He also had close links with the Western Australian Museum, and worked with them on their representations of Aboriginal issues for over thirty years. 

He died after a short illness on 12 January 2010. He was 78.

Activism 
Colbung campaigned for the recognition of cultural and human rights for Aboriginal Australians, and was involved in the Australian Black Power Movement of the 1960s. He was instrumental in the development of the Aboriginal Heritage Act 1972 for the protection and preservation of material of cultural significance. 

Colbung became particularly known for his leading role in ensuring that the severed head of his ancestor, the Noongar warrior Yagan, was repatriated from Britain to Australia in 1997.

Notes

References

External links
 Colbung, Ken (1988) "Not Land Rights but Land Rites", AIATSIS Wentworth Lecture 1988

1931 births
2010 deaths
Members of the Order of Australia
Members of the Order of the British Empire
Art and cultural repatriation
Australian indigenous rights activists
Noongar elders
Members of the Stolen Generations
Australian stockmen